Chemillé-sur-Indrois (literally Chemillé on Indrois) is a commune in the Indre-et-Loire department, central France.

Geography
The Indrois flows west through the commune and crosses the village.

Population

See also
 Communes of the Indre-et-Loire department

References

Communes of Indre-et-Loire